Saor Raidió Chonamara (Free Radio Connemara) was an Irish language pirate radio station that was formed out of frustration over the lack of Irish-language media by the civil rights movement Gluaiseacht Cearta Sibhialta. The station started broadcasting on Easter Saturday, 28 March 1970, later gaining some press coverage (featured in the Irish Independent once and in the regional press).  These transmissions in the Gaeltacht were illegal (RTÉ had the monopoly at the time). The station maintained a certain level of secrecy with the transmitter and studio transported by Honda 50 at times to stay clear of the law.

The station's success helped force the Irish Government to establish RTÉ Raidió na Gaeltachta which finally came on the air in 1972.

External links
 a first hand account of one man's experiences with Free Radio Connemara
 Irish media and cinema: A chapter in a book on Irish culture and customs
 Saor Raidió Chonamara page on Radiowaves.FM

References

Pirate radio stations in Ireland
Irish-language radio stations
1970 establishments in Ireland